Navya is a French company specialized in the design and construction of autonomous and electric vehicles.

History

In June 2014, Christophe Sapet, co-founder of the companies Infogrames and Infonie, joined the investment fund Robolution Capital to take over the assets of the company Induct, then in liquidation.

Induct launched Navia, a self-driving electric van. This prototype was demonstrated at the 2014 Consumer Electronics Show in Las Vegas and was tested on the site of the Civaux Nuclear Power Plant in June 2015 . 

Six engineers remained in the new structure renamed Navya, based between Paris and Lyon. One year after the company's takeover, the new company launched Arma, the first standalone production vehicle.

In 2016 in Lyon, an experimental service of electric and autonomous minibus service was launched in the Confluence district.

A Navya driverless shuttle is operating in downtown Las Vegas. The city of Las Vegas and Keolis initially partnered on a short term deployment in January 2017, which has been followed by a year-long pilot sponsored by AAA of Northern California, Nevada & Utah for a 0.6 mile loop involving eight intersections and connected infrastructure. On November 8, 2017 the shuttle was involved in a minor incident when it was grazed by a delivery truck. The human driver was found to be at fault. As of May 2018, 25,000 passengers had ridden the AAA Self-Driving Shuttle. The current AAA sponsored pilot program is highlighted under Transportation in Las Vegas.

Navya has self-driving vehicles being piloted in Singapore.

In April 2019, Navya self-driving buses enter commercial service in downtown Oslo, Norway's capital.

In April 2020, Navaya was adopted to a Japanese town of Sakai as the country's first public service of autonomous mobility on open roads.
 And, Sakai town started operating the service in November. In August 2021, Softbank backed Boldly announced that they decided to roll out more stops in Sakai after the successful test run.

In June 2021 Etienne Hermite stepped down as CEO and was replaced by Pierre Lahutte 

In July 2021, Navya received 7.5m Euros of Subsidies from the Government of France to develop further Projects 

In September 2021, Navya and Darwin launched the first autonomous shuttle project on Public Roads in the UK 

In September 2021, Navya also began testing its new Autonom Tract 135 in with French Logistics Company Geodis. The Autonom Tract is an autonomous tractor for baggage handling.

Navya has been in receivership since 1 February 2023. They are continuing operational and commercial activities whilst bids for the company are being sought by the Receiver.

References

Car manufacturers of France
Self-driving car companies
Electric vehicle manufacturers of France
French brands
Villeurbanne
Companies based in Auvergne-Rhône-Alpes
Companies listed on Euronext Paris